The 1982 New York gubernatorial election was held on November 2, 1982 to elect the Governor and Lieutenant Governor of New York. Incumbent Democratic Governor Hugh Carey chose not to run for a third term, which resulted in an open race. Democratic nominee Mario Cuomo, the Lieutenant Governor of New York, narrowly defeated Republican Lewis Lehrman, a banker who ran as a conservative.

Both candidates had been considered unlikely victors of their respective parties' primaries. Cuomo had unexpectedly defeated Ed Koch, the Mayor of New York City, to win the Democratic nomination. Cuomo was considered a political liberal who worked to revitalize the New Deal coalition. Entering the race as a political novice, Lehrman reportedly spent $7 million to boost his profile through advertising, beginning as early as January 1981. Lehrman ran a law and order campaign, referring to criminals as "savages", and on fiscal policy pledged cuts to the state income tax.

Cuomo ultimately won what was described as "a classic left vs. right battle" by a 50.9 to 47.5 percent margin, buoyed by voters in New York City. Cuomo would go on to serve three terms in office before ultimately losing reelection in 1994. This would be the closest Republican performance until the 2022 New York gubernatorial election with Lee Zeldin 's 46.8%.

Democratic primary

Candidates
Mario Cuomo, Lieutenant Governor of New York and former Secretary of New York State
Ed Koch, Mayor of New York City since 1978

Declined
Robert Abrams, New York State Attorney General
Carol Bellamy, New York City Council President 
Hugh Carey, incumbent Governor of New York since 1975 

The Democratic primary shaped up as a rematch of the 1977 New York City mayoral election between Mario Cuomo and Ed Koch. Koch won a Democratic primary runoff narrowly over Cuomo and then defeated Cuomo, running on the Liberal Party of New York ticket, again in the general election. In the meantime, Cuomo had been elected Lieutenant Governor in 1978 and Koch had been re-elected to a second term as Mayor in 1981.

Governor Hugh Carey announced he would not stand for re-election to a third term on January 15, amid low approval ratings and nascent challenges from within his own party, including by Lieutenant Governor Mario Cuomo. After Carey announced he would not run, New York City Mayor Ed Koch entered the race. His decision in turn discouraged Robert Abrams and Carol Bellamy from running.

Campaign
Koch's status as the early front-runner was quickly derailed by the publication of an interview he had given to Playboy in late 1981, in which he exalted life in New York City and denigrated suburban and rural lifestyles in comparison. On a trip to Albany following the article's publication, Koch was booed loudly. He described the interview as "foolish" and apologized to upstate voters.

Both candidates emphasized their respective records. Cuomo differentiated himself by his opposition to the death penalty, and attempted to link Koch to Republican politicians and President Ronald Reagan. Nevertheless, at the June party convention in Albany, Koch received the party's endorsement with 61% of the vote.

Despite an early pledge of neutrality, Governor Carey endorsed Koch late in the campaign. Cuomo criticized Carey's decision to endorse Koch, and called Carey "a good Governor and a lousy politician.''

Results
Cuomo's victory was considered a "stunning upset" by the New York Times that relied on "an unusual coalition of liberal Democrats, labor, minorities and upstaters." Koch ran strongly in Jewish communities, while Cuomo won black, liberal, and Italian communities by a similar margin. A key to Cuomo's victory was his strong showing in New York City itself; though Koch won the city and its four suburban counties (Rockland, Westchester, Suffolk, and Nassau) as expected, Cuomo kept the margin close and won half of the city's Assembly districts. That, combined with large victories in nearly every upstate county, allowed Cuomo to win.

Koch endorsed Cuomo immediately, declaring "what's important to all of us is that we keep a Democrat in Albany."

Republican primary

Candidates
Paul J. Curran, former U.S. Attorney for the Southern District of New York
Lewis Lehrman, investment banker and former president of Rite Aid

Declined
Edward Regan, New York State Comptroller (ran for re-election)

Campaign
Lehrman spent heavily to raise his profile as a political novice. He spent over a year campaigning before the primary and spent a record $7 million, more than half of which was his own money. He began running television advertisements in January 1981. Curran spent less than $500 thousand. The Harvard Crimson summarized Lehrman's unexpected rise to victory:"Lehrman saturated the airwaves and took the Republican primary in a romp, reportedly spending more than $6 million of his own money for that initial race alone."Lehrman was also boosted by the endorsement of the Conservative Party, which was said to "strongly influence" the primary as it had in 1978, giving Lehrman a "head start" against the field. After he received the endorsement and it became evident the Conservative Party would stick by it, Edward Regan declined to run. Regan was widely seen as the leading candidate for the nomination. Regan's decision may also have been influenced by his reliance on Wall Street funding, which was largely devoted to Koch.

Lehrman utilized harsh rhetoric on the issue of crime, referring to criminals as "savages" and criticizing the Court of Appeals for deference to defendants. He pledged "systematic" cuts to the state income tax and raised the possibility of a sales tax reduction.

Results

General election

Candidates 

 Jane Benedict (Unity)
 Robert J. Bohner (Right to Life)
 Mario Cuomo, Lieutenant Governor of New York (Democratic, Liberal)
 Lewis Lehrman, investment banker (Conservative, Republican, Statewide Independent)
 John H. Northrup (Libertarian)
 Nancy Ross (New Alliance)
 Diane Wang (Socialist Workers)

Results

References

1982
Gubernatorial
New York